Ashton-on-Mersey School is a secondary school in Ashton upon Mersey, Greater Manchester, England.

The school is an academy, part of The Dean Trust which includes Broadoak School and Lord Derby Academy in Huyton. Ashton-on-Mersey School serves around 1,400 students aged 11 to 18, and is a larger than average school. Ofsted has graded the school "Outstanding" across four inspections. The school was graded "Good" overall by Ofsted after an inspection on 22–23 January 2019. Some of its policies include no offensive or abusive language and neat uniform.

In 2011, 91% of pupils achieved 5A*-C, 61% achieved 5A*-C including English and Maths. 80% of pupils achieved 2+ A*-C in Science. 99% of pupils left with 5A*-G. 98% of pupils left with 1+ A*-C. 35% of pupils left with 3+ A*-A.

Sports college
Ashton on Mersey became a specialist sports college in 1998. One of its main sponsors is Manchester United Football Club.

Gymnasium
The school's gymnasium is open to the public after school on weekends and holidays. It offers various sorts of sports. There is also a climbing wall which can be hired for children's parties.

Awards
The school has many awards including Charter Mark and Investor People.

Notable alumni
 Marcus Rashford
 Karl Pilkington

References

External links
http://www.aomschool.co.uk/
http://www.aomfitness.co.uk/

Schools in Sale, Greater Manchester
Secondary schools in Trafford
Academies in Trafford